Randolph Community College is a public community college in Randolph County, North Carolina.  It is part of the North Carolina Community College System.

History

The college opened in September 1962 as "Randolph Industrial Education Center", a joint city-county industrial education center, with 75 full-time students.  Merton H. Branson served as the school's first president.

The college became a member of the North Carolina Community College System in 1963 when the North Carolina legislature established a separate system of community colleges.  From 1965-79 the school was known as "Randolph Technical Institute", and as "Randolph Technical College" from 1979-88.  It adopted the name Randolph Community College in 1988. The college's nickname is the Armadillos.

Academics
Randolph Community College currently offers over 25 vocational and technical degrees, including a college transfer program and a continuing education program.  The college is accredited by the Commission on Colleges of the Southern Association of Colleges and Schools. Annual enrollment for curriculum students is 3,767; annual enrollment for continuing education students is 7,526.

Randolph Community College also has a partnership with Randolph County public schools which created the Randolph Early College High School in 2006. The Randolph Early College High School (RECHS) is an autonomous, nontraditional public high school involved in the North Carolina Innovative High Schools Program, and is located on the school's main campus. Students are selected to attend RECHS based on an application process and typically enter at the beginning of their high school career. RECHS seeks to target economically disadvantaged, minority and first generation college-bound students.

Campus
The school is located in Asheboro, North Carolina, at the McDowell Road Exit off U.S. 220 just south of the U.S. 64/N.C. 49 interchange.  The college draws from a population base of just over 25,000 in Asheboro and 141,752 countywide.

RCC’s  main campus in Asheboro contains eleven major buildings and the Richard Petty Education Center for its Automotive Systems and Autobody programs which opened in 2009.   Three satellite centers include the Archdale Center, serving residents in the northwest corner of Randolph County, the Randleman Center, and a  Emergency Services Training Center located just outside Asheboro near Franklinville.

References

External links
Official website

Two-year colleges in the United States
North Carolina Community College System colleges
Universities and colleges accredited by the Southern Association of Colleges and Schools
Education in Randolph County, North Carolina
Buildings and structures in Randolph County, North Carolina
Asheboro, North Carolina